Douglas Silva Bacelar (born 4 April 1990), simply known as Douglas, is a Brazilian professional footballer who plays as a central defender.

Career
In January 2013, Douglas moved to Dnipro Dnipropetrovsk on a five-year deal from CR Vasco da Gama. In his first appearance for his new club, he scored 4 goals and assisted on 1 more in a 7–6 loss.

Honours

Club
Dnipro Dnipropetrovsk
UEFA Europa League: runner-up 2014–15

Individual
UEFA Europa League Squad of the season: 2014–15

References

External links
Official Website

 

1990 births
Living people
Footballers from São Paulo
Association football defenders
Brazilian footballers
CR Vasco da Gama players
São Paulo FC players
Associação Chapecoense de Futebol players
FC Dnipro players
SC Dnipro-1 players
Campeonato Brasileiro Série A players
Ukrainian Premier League players
Giresunspor footballers
Süper Lig players
Brazilian expatriate footballers
Expatriate footballers in Ukraine
Brazilian expatriate sportspeople in Ukraine
Expatriate footballers in Turkey
Brazilian expatriate sportspeople in Turkey